Chojnów  (Silesian German: Hoyn, Silesian language: Chojnůw) is a small town in Legnica County, Lower Silesian Voivodeship, in south-western Poland. Chojnów is the administrative seat of the rural gmina called Gmina Chojnów, although the town is not part of its territory and forms a separate urban gmina. As of December 2021, the town has 13,002 inhabitants.

It has railroad connections to Bolesławiec and Legnica.

Heraldry
The Chojnów coat of arms is a blue escutcheon featuring a white castle with three towers. To the right side of the central tower is a silver crescent moon and to its left side a golden sun. In the gate of the castle is a Silesian Eagle on a yellow background. Chojnów's motto is "Friendly City".

Geography
Chojnów is located in the Central-Western part of the Lower Silesia region. The Skora (Leather) River flows through the town in a westerly direction.

To the South of the town is the surrounding Chojnowska Plain.

History

The town is first mentioned in a Latin mediaeval document issued in Wrocław on February 26, 1253, stating, the Silesian Duke Henry III when the town is mentioned under the name Honowo. Possible the name of nearby Hainau Island. The name is of Polish origin, and in more modern records from the 19th century, the Polish name appears as Hajnów, while Haynau is the Germanized version of the original Polish name.

The settlement of Haynow was mentioned in a 1272 deed. It was already called a civitas in a 1288 document issued by the Piast duke Henry V of Legnica, and officially received town privileges in 1333 from Duke Bolesław III the Generous. It was part of the duchies of Wrocław, Głogów and Legnica of fragmented Poland and remained under the rule of the Piast dynasty until 1675. Its population was predominantly Polish. In 1292 the first castellan of Chojnów, Bronisław Budziwojowic, was mentioned. In the 14th and early 15th centuries Chojnów was granted various privileges, including staple right and gold mining right, thanks to which it flourished.

The town survived the Hussites, who burned almost the entire town center and castle, but it quickly helped recover its former glory. The largest boom Chojnów experienced was in the 16th century, however by the end of that century began to decline due to fires and epidemic, which claimed many victims in 1613. During the Thirty Years War (1618–1648), there was another outbreak in the city, it was occupied by the Austrians and Swedes and in 1642 it was also plundered by the Swedes. It remained part of the Piast-ruled Duchy of Legnica until its dissolution in 1675, when it was incorporated to Habsburg-ruled Bohemia.

In the 18th century, cloth production developed and a clothmaking school was established in the town. One of two main routes connecting Warsaw and Dresden ran through the town in the 18th century and Kings Augustus II the Strong and Augustus III of Poland traveled that route numerous times. In 1740 the town was captured by Prussia and subsequently annexed in 1742. In 1804 it suffered a flood. During the Napoleonic wars there were more epidemics. In 1813 in Chojnów, Napoleon Bonaparte issued instructions regarding the reorganization of the 8th Polish Corps of Prince Józef Poniatowski. The event is commemorated by a plaque in the facade of the Piast Castle. A railway line was opened in the 19th century. Sewer, Gas lighting a Newspaper and a hospital soon followed as the towns economy improved.

The city was not spared in World War II, with 30% of the town being destroyed on February 10, 1945, when Soviet Red Army troops took the abandoned town. After World War II and the implementation of the Oder-Neisse line in 1945, the town passed to the Republic of Poland. It was repopulated by Poles, expelled from former eastern Poland annexed by the Soviet Union. In 1946 it was renamed Chojnów, a more modern version of the old Polish Hajnów. Also Greeks, refugees of the Greek Civil War, settled in Chojnów.

Population

 1428 – 15 inhabitants
 1633 – 500
 1657 – 180
 1742 – 400
 1788 – 20,176
 1801 – 2,314
 1890 – 8,115
 1910 – 10,500
 2005 – 14,510
 2011 – 14,367

Economy
Chojnów is an industrial and agricultural town. Among local products are: paper, agricultural machinery, chains, metal furniture for hospitals, equipment for the meat industry, beer, wine, leather clothing, and clothing for infants, children and adults.

Sights and nature
Among the interesting monuments of Chojnów are the 13th-century castle of the Dukes of Legnica (currently used as a museum), two old churches, the Baszta Tkaczy (Weavers' Tower) and preserved fragments of city walls.

The biggest green area in Chojnów is small forest Park Piastowski (Piast's Park), named after Piast dynasty. Wild animals that can be found in the Chojnów area are roe deer, foxes, rabbits and wild domestic animals, especially cats.

Culture and sport

Every year in the first days of June, the Days of Chojnów (Dni Chojnowa) are celebrated. The Whole-Poland bike race Masters has been organized yearly in Chojnów for the past few years.

Chojnów has a Municipal sports and recreation center formed in 2008 holding various events, festivals, reviews, exhibitions, and competitions. The regional Museum is housed in the old Piast era castle. The collections include tiles, relics, and the castle garden. Next to the Museum there is a municipal library. In śródmiejskim Park, near the Town Hall is the amphitheatre.

The local government-run weekly newspaper is Gazeta Chojnowska, which has been published since 1992.
It is published biweekly. Editions have a run of 900 copies and it is one of the oldest newspapers in Poland issued without interruption. The Chojnów is the official newspaper of Chojnów with copy run of 750 copies.

Education

In Chojnów, there are two kindergartens, two elementary schools and two middle schools.
Mary Konopnickiej is the smallest elementary school in Chojnów, and is located in the northern part of the city, close to the train station and founded in 1962.
Janusz Korczak is the largest primary school in Chojnów in the southern part of the town.
Middle School No. (Pope John Paul II), it is situated in the north-western part of the city next to the "Small Church".
Gimnazjum nr 2 im. Nicolaus Copernicus is the largest high school in Chojnów.
Liceum Ogólnokształcące im. Nicolaus Copernicus

Religion
Chojnów is in the Catholic deanery of Chojnów and has two parishes, Immaculate Conception of the Blessed Virgin Mary and also the Holy Apostles Peter and Paul. Both parishes have active congregations.
There are also two Congregations of Jehovah's witnesses.

Notable people
 Johann Wilhelm Ritter (1776–1810), chemist and physicist
 Georg Michaelis (1857–1936), politician, Chancellor of Germany (1917)
 Edith Jacobson (1897–1978), German psychoanalyst
 Oswald Lange (1912–2000), German–American aerospace engineer 
 Horst Mahler (born 1936), German lawyer, former Red Army Faction militant, now Neo-Nazi activist

Twin towns – sister cities

Chojnów is twinned with:
 Commentry, France
 Egelsbach, Germany
 Mnichovo Hradiště, Czech Republic

Gallery

References

External links

City hall homepage 
Chojnow social news portal 
Chojnow Online 
E-info about Chojnow 
Chojnow social news portal 
 
Jewish Community in Chojnów on Virtual Shtetl

Cities and towns in Lower Silesian Voivodeship
Legnica County
Cities in Silesia